Epectasis juncea is a species of beetle in the family Cerambycidae, and the type species of its genus. It was described by Newman in 1840, originally under the genus Saperda. It has a wide distribution between Central and South America.

References

Pteropliini
Beetles described in 1840